Bansulab may refer to:
 Bansulab-e Hattem
 Bansulab-e Kalbali
 Bansulab-e Nam Khas
 Bansulab-e Shir Mohammad
 Bansulab-e Shirzad